Rhegion, also called "Rhagion" or "Rhegium", was a town (sometimes described as a military compound) of ancient Thrace, inhabited during Byzantine times.

Its site is located near Küçükçekmece in European Turkey. Across Lake Küçükçekmece from the site are the ruins of Bathonea.

References

Populated places in ancient Thrace
Former populated places in Turkey
Populated places of the Byzantine Empire
History of Istanbul Province